Francesco La Vecchia (born September 10, 1954) is an Italian classical conductor.

Biography and career 
La Vecchia was born in Rome, and began studying music with his grandfather, who taught him theory, harmony and composition. His first instrument was the classical guitar. He gave his first performance at age 9, and continued studying with Alirio Diaz. In 1972, he founded the Boccherini Quintet, and played hundreds of concerts with this ensemble in Europe, America and Asia.

In 1978, La Vecchia founded the Accademia Internazionale di Musica Arts Academy. In 1982 he began his career as conductor, and was named Permanent Conductor of the Symphonic Institution of Rome. Since then, La Vecchia has conducted more than one hundred orchestras around the world.

In 1993 La Vecchia founded the New World Young Orchestra in Latin America. In 2001 he was made Director of the Professional Training Course for Orchestral Conductor Professors, and at this time launched the Ottorino Respighi Youth Orchestra. In 2002 he was named artistic and musical director of the Orchestra Sinfonica di Roma, and in 2009 he was named Principal Guest Conductor of the Berliner Symphoniker Orchestra.

Specializing in Italian music, La Vecchia has made dozens of recordings, including the first complete orchestral works of Alfredo Casella and those of Giuseppe Martucci (that was previously recorded by M° Francesco d'Avalos with the Philarmonia Orchestra), both for the Naxos label. He has also recorded the works of Franco Ferrara.

References

External links
 La Vecchia's web site
 La Vecchia's biography on the Naxos web site
 Interview with La Vecchia on the Naxos web site

1954 births
Living people
Musicians from Rome
Italian male conductors (music)
21st-century Italian conductors (music)
21st-century Italian male musicians